Tuttington is a village and former civil parish, now in the parish of Burgh and Tuttington, in the Broadland district, in the county of Norfolk, England. The village is 11.1 miles south of Cromer, 15 miles north of Norwich and 129 miles north-east of London. The village lies 3 miles east of the nearby town of Aylsham.

The villages name probably means, 'farm/settlement connected with Tutta' or perhaps, 'farm/settlement of Tutta's people'.

The nearest railway station is at North Walsham for the Bittern Line which runs between Sheringham, Cromer and Norwich. The nearest airport is Norwich International Airport.

Its church, St Peter and St Paul, is one of 124 existing round-tower churches in Norfolk.

Opposite the church, there is a Dutch gabled building that used to be the village shop and post office, which closed in May 1987. Next door to that there used to be a pub called The Ship. It has been said that as the village is several miles from the sea or any navigable waterways, this name could be a corruption of The Sheep as the pub may have been a welcome watering hole for drovers.

Civil parish 
On 1 April 1935 the parish of Burgh was merged with Tuttington, on 21 April 1980 the parish was renamed "Burgh & Tuttington". In 1931 the parish of Tuttington (prior to the merge) had a population of 152.

References

External links

St Peter and St Paul's on the European Round Tower Churches website

Villages in Norfolk
Former civil parishes in Norfolk
Broadland